Trimble House may refer to:

Trimble House (Lonoke, Arkansas), listed on the National Register of Historic Places in Lonoke County, Arkansas
Trimble-McCrary House, Lonoke, AR, listed on the NRHP in Arkansas
Trimble–Parker Historic Farmstead District, Bloomfield, IA, listed on the NRHP in Iowa
Trimble House (Wickliffe, Kentucky), listed on the National Register of Historic Places in Ballard County, Kentucky
George Trimble House (Colonie, New York), listed on the NRHP in New York
James S. Trimble House, Mount Gilead, OH, listed on the NRHP in Ohio
George Trimble House (Mechanicsburg, Pennsylvania), listed on the NRHP in Pennsylvania

See also
George Trimble House (disambiguation)